Candlewood Elementary School may refer to:
Candlewood Elementary School (Derwood, Maryland).
Candlewood Elementary School (San Antonio, Texas).